Matan Naor (born 3 November 1980) is an Israeli former basketball player.

Professional career
Naor increased Maccabi's youth department Rehovot. He started playing in the Premier League graduates Ramat Gan in 2000.

2001 was a breakthrough season of Naor, which is a partner in 28 games trained under Arik Shivek, and showed good ability and diverse.

During 2002, under the direction of Erez Edelstein was enlightened co season record of Ramat Gan. The group came to the finals, but lost to Maccabi Tel Aviv 3-0 in the series. National Cup basketball came to Ramat Gan to stage the semi-finals, where Eliminated by Hapoel Jerusalem.

Naor signed at the end of the season in Hapoel Tel Aviv. This season the team played first enlightened Israel, and opened one game starting lineup, as part of pre-European Basketball Championship held in Sweden.

Naor continued the following season with Hapoel Tel Aviv, and played a number of games in the Premier League and in Europe. However, enlightened showed instability, which led to its decline bench and later waived Pre squad ahead of the European Championship.

Naor signed 2004/5 season Hapoel Jerusalem.

Naor 2005/2006 season continued in Jerusalem and was part of the team's roster came Cup Finals and Finals basketball Final Four basketball league.

2006/2007 season playing enlightened disabled for a long period, during which time, the stages of the decision of the National Cup, which team won the title that year. Towards the end of the season recovered from the severe injury enlightened, but could not get back in shape game and could not help the team in the Final Four in Tel Aviv Maccabi lost.
In June 2007, he left Jerusalem and Ironi Nahariya signed a one year.

After qualifying campaign of the Israeli team (summer 2008) towards the European Basketball Championship, enlightened decided to take a break from basketball, and he traveled the world. After his return in early 2009, the group returned to Ironi Nahariya.

After one season Ironi Nahariya enlightened decided to join the major league osishkin, climbed with the National League, and two seasons later to the Premiership. Naor considered a symbol group of fans, and serves as team captain since joining.

On June 27, 2017, Naor parted ways with Hapoel Tel Aviv after playing ten season with the club.

On July 3, 2017, Naor signed with Elitzur Netanya of the Liga Artzit, Naor won the Liga Artzit championship title with Netanya, earning a promotion to the Israeli National League.

In July 2018, Naor signed a one-year deal with Hapoel Hevel Modi'in, where he won the Liga Artzit championship title for two consecutive years.

On July 18, 2019, Naor signed with Maccabi Hadera for the 2019–20 season.

References

1980 births
Living people
Hapoel Jerusalem B.C. players
Hapoel Hevel Modi'in B.C. players
Hapoel Tel Aviv B.C. players
Israeli Basketball Premier League players
Israeli men's basketball players
Israeli people of Iraqi-Jewish descent
Ironi Ramat Gan players
Ironi Nahariya players
Maccabi Rehovot B.C. players
Sportspeople from Rehovot
Small forwards